Festus may refer to:

People

Ancient world

Porcius Festus, Roman governor of Judea from approximately 58 to 62 AD
Sextus Pompeius Festus (later 2nd century), Roman grammarian
Festus (died 305), martyr along with Proculus of Pozzuoli
Festus (historian), Roman historian and secretary of the Emperor Valens
Postumius Rufius Festus Avienius, a poet from Etruria

Modern world

Festus Agu (born 1975), Nigerian retired footballer
Festus Baise (born 1980), Hong Kong footballer
Festus Ezeli (born 1989), Nigerian basketball player
Festus Hommius (1576–1642), Dutch Calvinist theologian
Festus Iyayi (1947–2013), Nigerian writer
Festus Mwangi Kiunjuri (born 1969), Kenyan politician
Festus Mogae (born 1939), former President of Botswana
Festus Okotie-Eboh (1919–1966), Nigerian politician and former minister for finance
Festus Olabode Ola (born 1956), Nigerian senator
Festus Onigbinde (born 1942), Nigerian football manager
Festus Perera (1931-2013), Sri Lankan Sinhala politician
Festus Walters (1849–1922), Ohio jurist and advocate for Gubernatorial judicial independence
Festus Tierney (1899–1973), former guard in the National Football League
Festus Ueitele, Namibian politician
Drew Hankinson (born 1983), professional wrestler who used the name Festus
Festus Arthur (born 2001), German professional footballer
 Festus Njeru Njue (born 1982), Prosecution Counsel at the Office of Director of Public Prosecutions(ODPP) in Kenya. He and Dr Sosteness Francis Materu co - authored a journal article titled as The Legal,Practical and Policy Dilemmas in Enforcing the Sexual Offences Act of Kenya in Relation to Consensual Adolescent Sex.

Places
 Festus, Missouri, a town in the United States
Festus Memorial Airport

Other uses
Festus Haggen, a character in the American television program Gunsmoke
"Festus", a poem by the English poet Philip James Bailey
Festus, a bronze dragon from Rick Riordan's The Heroes of Olympus fantasy novels